Brain Balls may refer to:

Brain balls, small stone-like balls claimed in Irish history and legend to have been made from the heads or brains of enemies
Brain Balls, a character in the animated series Futurama
Brain Ball, an annual event for the Welltower charity foundation

See also
Mindball